The 13th Delta Operations Squadron (13 DOS) is a United States Space Force unit. Assigned to Space Training and Readiness Command's Space Delta 13, it is responsible for providing operations support to the delta. It was activated on 16 September 2021 and is temporarily headquartered at Maxwell Air Force Base, Alabama.

List of commanders 
 Lt Col Joan Thompson, 16 September 2021

See also 
 Space Delta 13

References

External links 
 

Military education and training in the United States
Squadrons of the United States Space Force